Ronald B. Stafford (June 29, 1935 – June 24, 2005) was an American lawyer and politician from New York.

Life
He was born on June 29, 1935, in Plattsburgh, Clinton County, New York, the son of Halsey W. Stafford and Agnes M. Stafford. His father was a correctional officer in Clinton State Prison. He graduated from Columbia Law School in 1962. He began the practice of law in the Plattsburgh office of Harris Beach and entered politics as a Republican.

Stafford was a member of the New York State Senate from 1966 to 2002, sitting in the 176th, 177th, 178th, 179th, 180th, 181st, 182nd, 183rd, 184th, 185th, 186th, 187th, 188th, 189th, 190th, 191st, 192nd, 193rd and 194th New York State Legislatures. In 1974, he was the driving force behind the bid of Lake Placid, New York to host the 1980 Winter Olympics. He was Deputy Majority Leader from 1989 to 1992, and Chairman of the Committee on Finance from 1993 to 2002.

In 2000, he married Kay McCabe. After retiring from the Senate, he became President of CMA Consulting Services, of Latham, a company owned by his wife, which supplied red light cameras.

He died on June 24, 2005, at his home in Plattsburgh, of lung cancer.

Defense of state troopers' actions during Attica Prison Massacre 
In 1973, Stafford attacked the efforts of state prosecutors to investigate the killing of 30 inmates and 9 correctional officers and employees by law enforcement shooters during the retaking of Attica Prison in September 1971. He claimed the impanelling of a second grand jury by prosecutors had followed "'years of intense pressure from radical groups and individuals'" to "'use our law enforcement personnel as scapegoats.'"

References

1936 births
2005 deaths
Politicians from Plattsburgh, New York
Republican Party New York (state) state senators
Columbia Law School alumni
Deaths from cancer in New York (state)
20th-century American politicians